The 2015 AFC U-16 Women's Championship qualification was a women's under-16 football competition which decided the participating teams of the 2015 AFC U-16 Women's Championship. Players born between 1 January 1999 and 31 December 2001 were eligible to compete in the tournament.

A total of eight teams qualified to play in the final tournament, including Japan, North Korea, China PR (hosts), and Thailand, who qualified directly as the top four finishers of the 2013 AFC U-16 Women's Championship.

The top two teams of the final tournament qualified for the 2016 FIFA U-17 Women's World Cup in Jordan (besides Jordan who qualified automatically as hosts).

Draw
The draw for the qualifiers was held on 17 June 2014 at the AFC House in Kuala Lumpur. A total of 21 AFC member national teams entered the qualifying stage and were drawn into four groups.
West Zone had 12 entrants from Central Asia, South Asia and West Asia, where they were drawn into two groups of six teams.
East Zone had 9 entrants from ASEAN and East Asia (excluding direct qualifiers Japan, North Korea, China, and Thailand), where they were drawn into one group of five teams and one group of four teams.

The teams were seeded according to their performance in the previous season in 2013.

Notes
1 Non-FIFA member, ineligible for World Cup.

Format
In each group, teams played each other once at a centralised venue. The four group winners qualified for the final tournament.

Tiebreakers
The teams were ranked according to points (3 points for a win, 1 point for a draw, 0 points for a loss). If tied on points, tiebreakers would be applied in the following order:
Greater number of points obtained in the group matches between the teams concerned;
Goal difference resulting from the group matches between the teams concerned;
Greater number of goals scored in the group matches between the teams concerned;
Goal difference in all the group matches;
Greater number of goals scored in all the group matches;
Penalty shoot-out if only two teams are involved and they are both on the field of play;
Fewer score calculated according to the number of yellow and red cards received in the group matches (1 point for a single yellow card, 3 points for a red card as a consequence of two yellow cards, 3 points for a direct red card, 4 points for a yellow card followed by a direct red card);
Drawing of lots.

Groups
The matches were played between 4–8 October 2014 for Group C; 5–9 October 2014 for Group D; 15–23 October 2014 for Group B; 22–25 December 2014 for Group A.

Group A
All matches were initially to be held in Palestine, but were postponed.
After the withdrawal of four teams, the two remaining teams played two matches against each other, both held in Bahrain.
Times listed were UTC+3.

Group B
All matches were held in Bangladesh.
Times listed were UTC+6.

Group C
All matches were held in Malaysia.
Times listed were UTC+8.

Group D
All matches were held in Malaysia.
Times listed were UTC+8.

Qualified teams
The following eight teams qualified for the final tournament.

2 Bold indicates champion for that year. Italic indicates host for that year.

Goalscorers
10 goals
 Liang Kai-jou

8 goals

 Fatemeh Geraeli
 Fatemeh Ghasemi
 Shahnoza Kurbonova

7 goals
 Roja Devi

6 goals
 Anushka Samuel

4 goals

 Ashlee Brodigan
 Sanjida Akhter
 Thin Thin Yu
 Dildora Ergasheva

3 goals

 Eliza Ammendolia
 Chen Yu-chieh
 Sushmita Bardhan
 Nour Zoqash
 Lim Su-bin
 Maftuna Panjieva

2 goals

 Melina Ayres
 Joey Cartwright
 Panagiota Petratos
 Lipi Akhter
 Bipasha Mali
 Premi Chiru
 Jabamani Tudu
 Fatemeh Hosseini
 Tasneem Abulrob
 Tasnim Isleem
 Hnin Kalyar Ko
 Kay Zin Myint
 Itsuko Bacatan
 Joyce Semacio
 Eom Keun-byeol
 Gwon Hui-seon
 Ju Yee-un
 Yang Hyeon-ji
 Ruzikhon Askarova
 Zarina Boboeva
 Feruza Bobokhujaeva
 Nguyễn Thị Quỳnh
 Nguyễn Thị Tuyết Ngân

1 goal

 Hannah Bourke
 Grace Maher
 Adriana Taranto
 Krishna Rani
 Song Channa
 Yon Yeurn
 Huang Yu-tzu
 Eva Panna
 Hajar Dabbaghi
 Leen Al-Btoush
 Jeeda Al-Naber
 Luna Sahloul
 Yasmeen Zabian
 July Kyaw
 Khine Thazin Oo
 Mikhaela Jumawan
 Lindsay Whaley
 Im So-jeong
 Park Hye-jeong
 Song Bo-ram
 Yang Seo-yeong
 Naeema Juma
 Dilnoza Utamova
 Nguyễn Thị Nga
 Nguyễn Thị Nụ
 Phạm Thu Hiền

Own goal
 Amna Fahad (playing against Jordan)

References

External links
AFC U-16 Women's Championship, the-AFC.com

Qualification
2015
U-16 Women's Championship qualification
2014 in women's association football
2014 in youth sport